Gekko shibatai is a species of gecko, a lizard in the family Gekkonidae. The species is endemic to the Ryukyu Islands.

Etymology
The specific name, shibatai, is in honor of Japanese herpetologist Yasuhiko Shibata.

Geographic range
G. shibatai is found in the Tokara Group of the Ryukyu Islands. The type locality is Takarajima Island.

Habitat
The preferred natural habitat of G. shibatai, is forest.

Description
G. shibatai lacks distinct preanal pores even in the adult male.

Reproduction
G. shibatai is oviparous.

References

Further reading
Shibaike Y, Takahashi Y, Arikura I, Iiizumi R, Kitakawa S, Sakai M, Imaoka C, Shiro H, Tanaka H, Akakubo N, Nakano M, Ohne K, Kubota S, Kohno S, Ota H (2009). "Chromosome Evolution in the Lizard Genus Gekko (Gekkonidae, Squamata, Reptilia) in the East Asian Islands". Cytogenetic and Genome Research 127: 182–190.
Toda M, Sengoku S, Hikida T, Ota H (2008). "Description of Two New Species of the Genus Gekko (Squamata: Gekkonidae) from the Tokara and Amami Island Groups in the Ryukyu Archipelago, Japan". Copeia 2008 (2): 452–466. (Gekko shibatai, new species).

Gekko
Reptiles described in 2008
Endemic reptiles of Japan